Rockport Harbor is a bay in Rockport, Maine, in the United States of America.

Bays of Knox County, Maine
Bays of Maine